A mug is a large cup with a handle.

Mug or Mugs may also refer to:

Arts, entertainment, and media
 Mug (film), a 2018 Polish film
  Mug EP, by the band Creaming Jesus
 Mr. Mugs, a main character in a series of children's books by Martha Kambeitz and Carol Roth

Legends and mythology
 Mug Corb, a legendary High King of Ireland
 Mug Nuadat, in Irish mythology a king of Munster
 Mug Ruith, in Irish mythology a powerful blind druid

Law enforcement
Mug book, a collection of photographs of criminals, typically mugshots
 Mug shot, a photographic portrait of a person from the waist up, typically taken after a person is arrested

Other uses
 Mug, an American slang term for the face
 Mug,  British slang term for cuckold  e.g., as used in Parade's End
 Metric slug, or Mug  a unit of mass
 Mug Root Beer, a beverage brand

See also
 MUG (disambiguation)
"Mugged" (Flight of the Conchords), the third episode of  the TV series Flight of the Conchords
 Mugging (disambiguation)